Linnamäe is a village in Lääne-Nigula Parish, Lääne County, in western Estonia.

References

 

Villages in Lääne County